Jerome Theda Syverton (March 29, 1907, Courtenay, North Dakota – January 28, 1961, New York City) was an American physician and professor of microbiology.

Biography
At the University of North Dakota, Syverton matriculated in 1923, graduated with an A.B. in 1927 and a B.S. in 1928. He was an instructor in bacteriology at the University of North Dakota from 1928 to 1929. He graduated with an M.D. in 1931 from Harvard Medical School. From 1931 to 1932 he completed a medical internship and assistant residency at Duke University Hospital. From 1932 to 1934 he was an assistant in pathology and bacteriology at the Rockefeller Institute for Medical Research, where he studied virology under Peter K. Olitsky. In the department of bacteriology of the University of Rochester School of Medicine and Dentistry, Syverton was an instructor from 1934 to 1937, an assistant professor from 1937 to 1939, and an associate professor from 1939 to 1947. In 1942 he had a sabbatical leave at the Vanderbilt University School of Medicine as a visiting associate professor of pathology and bacteriology. From 1944 to 1946 he served on active duty in the U.S. Navy as a visiting investigator act the Rockefeller Institute for Medical Research and as member of the U.S. Navy's Medical Research Unit 2 in the Pacific. From 1947 to 1948 he was a full professor and head of the department of microbiology at the Louisiana State University School of Medicine. From 1948 until his death in 1961, he was a professor and head of the department of bacteriology at the University of Minnesota.

Syverton did research on polio, cancer, rheumatic fever, adenoviruses, filterable viruses, interepidemic survival of viruses, tissue cultures, and disease transmission by arthropods. From 1933 to 1960 he was the author or co-author of over 200 scientific publications.

Syverton received in 1938 the Eli Lilly and Company-Elanco Research Award. He was elected in 1951 a fellow of the American Association for the Advancement of Science.

In 1932 he married Mildred Sloulin (1909–2010). They had three daughters.

Selected publications
 
 
 
 
 
 
 
  (over 1300 citations)

References

1907 births
1961 deaths
20th-century American physicians
American microbiologists
University of North Dakota alumni
Harvard Medical School alumni
University of Rochester faculty
University of Minnesota faculty
Fellows of the American Association for the Advancement of Science
People from Stutsman County, North Dakota